Vendetta is the fourth album by American band Throwdown. This album marks the group's initial shift from hardcore punk to metal. "Burn", was the album's lead single.

Track listing
All lyrics written by Dave Peters, all music composed by Throwdown.

"We Will Rise" – 3:24
"Speak the Truth" – 3:16
"Vendetta" – 2:50
"Burn" – 3:10
"Discipline" – 3:20
"To Live Is to Sacrifice" – 3:48
"Give My Life" – 4:07
"The World Behind" (featuring Howard Jones formerly of Killswitch Engage) – 4:03
"Shut You Down" (featuring Sean Martin formerly of Hatebreed) – 3:56 
"Annihilation (N.W.D.)" – 5:47
"This Is Where It Ends" – 1:45

Personnel 
 Dave Peters – vocals, co-production
 Matt Mentley - guitars
 Ben Dussault – drums
 Dom Macaluso – bass, co-production
 Alan Douches – mastering
 Rob Gil – digital editing
 Zeuss - Producer, mixing, engineering
 Jeff Gros – photography
 Ryan J. Downey – manager

References

2005 albums
Throwdown (band) albums
Trustkill Records albums
Albums produced by Chris "Zeuss" Harris